Malacoff were a Salvadoran professional football club based in Izalco, Sonsonate, El Salvador.

History
Named C.D. Curazao, the club was relocated in 2008 from Jayaque, La Libertad, to Izalco and renamed back to his historical name of Malacoff.

In 2010, Malacoff failed to enroll to the Salvadoran Third Division and ceased to exist.

Notable Coaches
 Carlos Recinos
 Gonzalo "Chalo" Henríquez (1984)
 Carlos E. Torres

References

Defunct football clubs in El Salvador
2010 disestablishments in El Salvador